Patrik Zdráhal (born 9 April 1995) is a Czech ice hockey forward currently playing for HC Vítkovice Ridera of the Czech Extraliga.

Playing career
In 2012, Zdráhal was the first draft pick by the Acadie–Bathurst Titan in the 2012 Canadian Hockey League (CHL) Import Draft.

On 4 November 2013, Zdráhal was traded to Rimouski Océanic in exchange for Scott Ok, Charles-Anthony Poulin, and a 2014 fourth round draft pick. While playing with Océanic, Zdráhal was one of eight CHL players selected to represent team Czech Republic at the 2014 World Junior Ice Hockey Championships in Sweden.

On 30 April 2014, Zdráhal returned to Europe with the HC Vítkovice Ridera. He signed an extension with the team on 4 May 2017, and again on 30 December 2018.

References

External links
 

1995 births
Living people
HC Vítkovice players
Czech ice hockey forwards
Rimouski Océanic players
Acadie–Bathurst Titan players
Sportspeople from Ostrava
Czech expatriate ice hockey players in Canada
HC Plzeň players
HC Litvínov players